Sasakwa is a town in Seminole County, Oklahoma, United States. The population was documented as 150 in both the 2010 and 2000 census.

History
A post office was established in 1880, and took the name from that given his trading post by Gov John E Brown, from the Seminole word meaning "wild goose". Sasakwa Female Academy existed at Sasakwa from 1880 to 1892. At that time Sasakwa was part of the [not sure it was Creek, part of Seminole nation today] Nation in the Indian Territory. The site of the present town was moved to where the train station was located.

In 1917, hundreds of men gathered on a farm near Sasakwa to protest the draft in World War I, an event called the Green Corn Rebellion.

Geography
Sasakwa is located at  (34.947915, -96.526206).

The town is on Oklahoma State Highway 56; Lake Konawa is to the west.

Demographics

As of the census of 2000, there were 150 people, 58 households, and 41 families residing in the town. There were 77 housing units at an average density of 367.0 per square mile (141.6/km2). The racial makeup of the town was 61.33% White, 1.33% African American, 28.67% Native American, and 8.67% from two or more races.

There were 58 households, out of which 27.6% had children under the age of 18 living with them, 48.3% were married couples living together, 19.0% had a female householder with no husband present, and 27.6% were non-families. 25.9% of all households were made up of individuals, and 15.5% had someone living alone who was 65 years of age or older. The average household size was 2.59 and the average family size was 3.02.

In the town, the population was spread out, with 30.7% under the age of 18, 9.3% from 18 to 24, 22.7% from 25 to 44, 20.7% from 45 to 64, and 16.7% who were 65 years of age or older. The median age was 35 years. For every 100 females, there were 74.4 males. For every 100 females age 18 and over, there were 79.3 males.

The median income for a household in the town was $20,750, and the median income for a family was $24,286. Males had a median income of $23,750 versus $13,542 for females. The per capita income for the town was $9,353. There were 19.6% of families and 24.3% of the population living below the poverty line, including 33.3% of under eighteens and 32.1% of those over 64.

Notable people
Sasakwa was home to Seminole Chiefs John Jumper and John F. Brown.

References

Towns in Seminole County, Oklahoma
Towns in Oklahoma